PLOS Neglected Tropical Diseases is a peer-reviewed open access scientific journal devoted to the study of neglected tropical diseases, including helminth, bacterial, viral, protozoan, and fungal infections endemic to tropical regions. PLOS Neglected Tropical Diseases is abstracted and indexed in PubMed and the Web of Science. It is the seventh and youngest member of the Public Library of Science family of open access journals.

Established in 2007 by founding editor Peter Hotez, with US$1.1 million in grant support from the Bill & Melinda Gates Foundation, PLOS Neglected Tropical Diseases was created to be "both catalytic and transformative in promoting science, policy, and advocacy for these diseases of the poor."

As with all journals of the Public Library of Science, PLOS Neglected Tropical Diseases is financed by charging authors a publication fee, while advertising from companies that sell drugs or medical devices are not accepted. It will waive the fee for authors who do not have the funds. The usage and reproduction of PLOS Neglected Tropical Diseases articles are subject to a Creative Commons Attribution License, version 2.5. In 2021, the journal expanded the scope of its coverage.

References

External links 
 
 

English-language journals
Creative Commons Attribution-licensed journals
Microbiology journals
Monthly journals
Open access journals
Parasitology journals
Publications established in 2007
PLOS academic journals